The Dancing Girl is a lost 1915 silent film drama produced by the Famous Players Film Company and distributed by Paramount Pictures. It is based on the 1891 Broadway play of the same name by Henry Arthur Jones. The film was directed by Allan Dwan and starred stage actress Florence Reed in her film debut. Reed's husband, Malcolm Williams, also appears in the film.

Plot

Cast
Florence Reed - Drusilla Ives
Fuller Mellish - David Ives
Lorraine Huling - Faith Ives
Malcolm Williams - A Quaker
William Russell - John Christison
Eugene Ormonde - Duke of Guiseberry
William Lloyd - Mr. Crake
Minna Gale - Lady Bawtry

References

External links

1915 films
American silent feature films
American films based on plays
Lost American films
Famous Players-Lasky films
Films directed by Allan Dwan
1915 drama films
Silent American drama films
American black-and-white films
1910s dance films
1915 lost films
Lost drama films
1910s American films